Tolperisone (trade name Mydocalm among others) is a centrally acting skeletal muscle relaxant used for the treatment of increased muscle tone associated with neurological diseases. It has been used since the 1960s.

Medical uses 
Tolperisone is indicated for use in the treatment of pathologically increased tone of the skeletal muscle caused by neurological diseases (damage of the pyramidal tract, multiple sclerosis, myelopathy, encephalomyelitis) and of spastic paralysis and other encephalopathies manifested with muscular dystonia.

Other possible uses include:
Spondylosis
Spondylarthrosis
Cervical and lumbar syndromes
Arthrosis of the large joints
Obliterating atherosclerosis of the extremity vessels
Diabetic angiopathy
Thromboangiitis obliterans
Raynaud's syndrome

Contraindications and cautions 
Manufacturers report that tolperisone should not be used in patients with myasthenia gravis. Only limited data are available regarding the safety in children, youths, during pregnancy and breastfeeding. It is not known whether tolperisone is excreted into mother's milk.

In 2012, following concerns on the safety and efficacy, an "article 31 referral" was triggered at the European Medicines Agency. The European Medicines Agency has recommended restricting the use of tolperisone. After review and a subsequent re-examination in 2012, the Agency concluded the safety and adverse reaction risks of this drug outweigh the benefits, and that there is weak support for its efficacy, in all but one indication (muscle stiffness or spasticity after stroke), and specifically, due to the prevalence of hypersensitivity symptoms such as flushing, rash, severe skin itchiness (with raised lumps), wheezing, difficulty breathing, and swallowing, fast heartbeat and fast decrease in blood pressure (basically anaphylaxis), their recommendations included ceasing advertising in Europe and ceasing injections, updating patient information leaflets, changing to another medicine for existing users, and for prescribers to only use it stroke patients when administered by mouth, not injection.

Side effects 
Adverse effects occur in fewer than 1% of patients and include muscle weakness, headache, arterial hypotension, nausea, vomiting, dyspepsia, and dry mouth. All effects are reversible. Allergic reactions occur in fewer than 0.1% of patient and include skin rash, hives, Quincke's edema, and in some cases anaphylactic shock.

Overdose 
Excitability has been noted after ingestion of high doses by children. In suicide studies of three isolated cases, it is believed that ingestion of tolperisone was the cause of death.

Interactions 
Tolperisone does not have a significant potential for interactions with other pharmaceutical drugs. It cannot be excluded that combination with other centrally acting muscle relaxants, benzodiazepines or nonsteroidal anti-inflammatory drugs (NSAIDs) may make a dose reduction necessary in some patients.

Pharmacology

Mechanism of action 
Tolperisone is a centrally acting muscle relaxant that acts at the reticular formation in the brain stem by blocking voltage-gated sodium and calcium channels.

Pharmacokinetics 
Tolperisone is absorbed nearly completely from the gut and reaches its peak blood plasma concentration after 1.5 hours. It is extensively metabolised in the liver and kidneys. The substance is excreted via the kidneys in two phases; the first with a half-life of two hours, and the second with a half-life of 12 hours.

Chemistry 
Tolperisone a piperidine derivative.

Society and culture

Brand names 
Brand names include Mydocalm, Biocalm, Mydeton, Miderizone, Mydoflex, Myolax, Myoxan and Viveo.

See also 
 Chemically and mechanistically related drugs: eperisone, inaperisone, lanperisone, silperisone

References 

1-Piperidinyl compounds
Muscle relaxants
Aromatic ketones
Calcium channel blockers
Sodium channel blockers